Bicharak (English: The Judge) is a Bengali psychological drama film directed by Pravat Mukhopadhyay and produced by Arundhati Devi based on a same name novel of Tarasankar Bandyopadhyay and music is composed by Timir Bhattachariya This film was released in 1959 under the banner of Prabhat Productions and received National Film Award for Best Feature Film in Bengali in 1960.

Plot
The plot unfolds with a series of flashbacks which reveals a judge's past and hidden secrets. Gyanendra, a judge lives with his wife Sarama. Being the Judge, with every trial of similar cases he remembers his past, the truth about his questionable actions. Gyanendra always recalls when he was a popular lawyer, married to Sumoti, a suspicious and rude lady. But he had a weak feelings for his professor's daughter Sarama. One day Gyanendra's house was burnt and his first wife Sumoti dies. Gyanendra could not make any attempt to save her, perhaps he was unable bear Sumati further. Thereafter he marries Sarama and becomes a judge, but realizes his crime and the past haunts him much.

Cast
 Uttam Kumar as Gyanendra
 Chhabi Biswas as Lawyer
 Pahari Sanyal as Professor
 Arundhati Devi as Sarama
 Dipti Roy as Sumati
 Chandrabati Devi
 Bani Hazra 		
 Atanu Ghosh

Soundtrack

Award
1960: Certificate of Merit Best Feature Film in Bengali - Bicharak

References

External links
 

1959 films
Bengali-language Indian films
1950s psychological drama films
Indian psychological drama films
Films based on Indian novels
Indian black-and-white films
1950s Bengali-language films
1959 drama films
Films based on works by Tarasankar Bandyopadhyay